Acylphosphatase-2 is an enzyme that in humans is encoded by the ACYP2 gene.

Function 

Acylphosphatase can hydrolyze the phosphoenzyme intermediate of different membrane pumps, particularly the Ca2+/Mg2+-ATPase from sarcoplasmic reticulum of skeletal muscle. Two isoenzymes have been isolated, called muscle acylphosphatase and erythrocyte acylphosphatase on the basis of their tissue localization. This gene encodes the muscle-type isoform (MT). An increase of the MT isoform is associated with muscle differentiation.

References

External links

Further reading 

 
 
 
 
 
 
 
 
 
 
 

Human proteins